The Kevins were a band formed in Melbourne, Australia in 1979. The song "Romeo Romeo" peaked at number 70 in 1982.

Discography

Extended Play

Singles

References

Australian musical groups